This is a list of fighter aces in the First World War from South Africa. Pilots were considered to be "aces" after they had shot down five or more enemy aircraft; 45 South Africans are believed to have achieved this feat, with the highest scorer being Andrew Beauchamp-Proctor, who is credited with 54 air victories.

During the war South African pilots served with the Royal Flying Corps (RFC), the South African Aviation Corps (SAAC) where they were engaged in German South West Africa and 26 Sqdn RFC in East Africa.

References 

South Africa
South African World War I flying aces